Christopher Henry Dawson  (12 October 188925 May 1970) was an English Catholic historian, independent scholar, who wrote many books on cultural history and Christendom. Dawson has been called "the greatest English-speaking Catholic historian of the twentieth century".

The 1988–1989 academic year at the College of Europe was named in Dawson's honour.

Life
Dawson was the only son of Lt. Colonel H.P. Dawson and Mary Louisa, eldest daughter of Archdeacon Bevan, Hay Castle. He was brought up at Hartlington Hall, Yorkshire.

Dawson was educated at Winchester College and Trinity College, Oxford, where he obtained 2nd class honours in Modern History in 1911. After his degree he studied economics. He also read the work of the German theologian Ernst Troeltsch.

Dawson's background was Anglo-Catholic, but he converted to Roman Catholicism in 1909.

In 1916, Dawson married Valery Mills, daughter of the architect Walter Edward Mills. They had two daughters and one son.

Writing

Dawson began publishing articles in The Sociological Review in 1920. His starting point was close to that of Oswald Spengler and Arnold J. Toynbee, others who were also interested in grand narratives conducted at the level of a civilisation. Dawson's first book, The Age of the Gods (1928), was apparently intended as the first of a set of five to trace European civilisation to the twentieth century.  However, he did not follow this plan to a conclusion.

Dawson was a proponent of an 'Old West' theory, the later term of David Gress, who cites Dawson in his From Plato to Nato (1998). Dawson rejected the blanket assumption that the Middle Ages in Europe failed to contribute any essential characteristics. He argued that the medieval Catholic Church was an essential factor in the rise of European civilisation, and wrote extensively in support of that thesis.

Career
Dawson was considered a leading Catholic historian. He was a Lecturer in the History of Culture, University College, Exeter (1930–6), the Forwood Lecturer in the Philosophy of Religion, University of Liverpool (1934), the Gifford Lecturer at the University of Edinburgh (1947 and 1948), and the Chauncey Stillman Professor of Roman Catholic Studies at Harvard University (1958–62). Dawson was elected as a Fellow of the British Academy in 1943.

From 1940 for a period he was editor of the Dublin Review.

Influence
His writings in the 1920s and 1930s made him a significant figure of the time, and an influence in particular on T. S. Eliot, who wrote of his importance. Dawson was on the fringe of 'The Moot', a literary discussion group, and also part of the Sword of the Spirit ecumenical group.  According to Bradley Birzer, Dawson also influenced the theological underpinnings of J. R. R. Tolkien's writings.

The topical approach outlined by Dawson for the study of Christian culture forms the core of the Catholic Studies program at Aquinas College. His work was influential in the founding of Campion College and the formation in 2012 of The Christopher Dawson Society for Philosophy and Culture Inc. in Perth, Western Australia.

Dawson's vision also outlines the Humanities and Catholic Culture program at the Franciscan University of Steubenville.

Comparable historians
As a revivalist of the Christian historian, Christopher Dawson has been compared with Kenneth Scott Latourette and Herbert Butterfield. Comparisons have also been made between the work of Dawson and Max Weber. Both employ a metahistorical approach to their subjects, and their subjects themselves bear similarities; namely, the influence of religion on aspects of western culture.

Works

Books
 The Age of the Gods (1928). Reissued by the Catholic University of America Press (2012)
 Progress and Religion: An Historical Inquiry (1929). Reissued by the Catholic University of America Press (2001)
 Christianity and the New Age (1931)
 The Making of Europe: An Introduction to the History of European Unity. London: Sheed and Ward, 1932. Reissued by the Catholic University of America Press, 2003.
 The Spirit of the Oxford Movement (1933)
 Enquiries into Religion and Culture (1933). Reissued by the Catholic University of America Press (2009)
 Medieval Religion and Other Essays (1934)
 Religion and the Modern State (1936)
 Beyond Politics (1939)
 The Claims of Politics (1939)
 The Judgment of the Nations (1942). Reissued by the Catholic University of America Press (2011)
 Gifford Lectures 1947–49
 Religion and Culture (1948) 
 Religion and the Rise of Western Culture (1950) 
 Understanding Europe (1952). Reissued by the Catholic University of America Press (2009)
 Medieval Essays (1954). Reissued by the Catholic University of America Press (2002)
 The Mongol Mission: Narratives and Letters of the Franciscan Missionaries in Mongolia and China in the Thirteenth and Fourteenth Centuries (1955). Republished in 1966 as Mission to Asia.
 Dynamics of World History (1957). Edited by John J. Mulloy et al. Reissued by the Intercollegiate Studies Institute (2002).
 The Movement of World Revolution (1959)
 Progress and Religion: An Historical Enquiry (1960) with others Reissued by the Catholic University of America Press (2001)
 The Historic Reality of Christian Culture (1960)
 The Crisis of Western Education: With Specific Programs for the Study of Christian Culture (1961). Reissued by the Catholic University of America Press (2010)
 The Dividing of Christendom (1965)
 The Formation of Christendom (1967)
 The Gods of Revolution (1972)
 Religion and World History: A Selection from the Works of Christopher Dawson (1975)
 Christianity and European Culture: Selections from the Work of Christopher Dawson  edited by Gerald J. Russello Reissued by the Catholic University of America Press (1998)

External links
 "The Catholic Tradition and the Modern State," The Catholic Review, January/March 1915.
 "Catholicism and the Bourgeois Mind," Crisis Magazine, 27 December 2011.
Catholic Studies

References

Further reading
 Birzer, Brad. Sanctifying the World: The Augustinian Life and Mind of Christopher Dawson, Christendom Press, 2007.
 Birzer, Brad. "Christopher Dawson on Liberalism," Part II, Part III, The Imaginative Conservative, June 2012.
 Birzer, Brad. "The Liberal Arts: Dawson’s Prerequisite for the Reconstruction of Christendom," Crisis Magazine, 11 October 2012.
 Bliese, John R. E. "Christopher Dawson," Modern Age, Summer 1979.
 Caldecott, Stratford and Morril, John. Eternity in Time: Christopher Dawson and the Catholic Idea of History, (T. & T. Clark, 1997).
 Elders, Leo J. "Christopher Dawson." Studia Gilsoniana 3 (2014): 49-62. online
 Fitzgibbon, George F. "The Cyclical Theory of Christopher Dawson," The American Catholic Sociological Review, Vol. 2, No. 1, Mar. 1941.
 Hart, Jeffrey. "Christopher Dawson and the History We Are Not Told," Modern Age, September 1997.
 Herce, Rubén. "Christopher Dawson on Spengler, Toynbee, Eliot and the notion of Culture." Cultura 12.2 (2015): 45-59 [Herce, Rubén. "Christopher Dawson on Spengler, Toynbee, Eliot and the notion of Culture." Cultura 12.2 (2015): 45-59. online].
 Hittinger, Russell. "Christopher Dawson on Technology and the Demise of Liberalism," CERC, 1993.
 Kirk, Russell. "The High Achievement of Christopher Dawson," The University Bookman, Volume 47, Number 1, Winter 2010.
 Marshall, Caroline T. "Modern Pioneers: Christopher Dawson, Champion of Christian Culture," Christianity Today, 10 January 2001.
 Mitchell, Philip Irving. "Civilization Sickness and the Suspended Middle: RG Collingwood, Christopher Dawson, and Historical Judgment." Logos: A Journal of Catholic Thought and Culture 21.3 (2018): 85-113.
 Olsen, Glenn W. "Why We Need Christopher Dawson," Communio, Vol. 35, Spring 2008.
 Olsen, Glenn W. "Christopher Dawson and the Renewal of Catholic Education," Logos, Volume 13, Number 3, Summer 2010.
 Parkes, H. B. "Christopher Dawson," Scrutiny, March 1937.
 Potts, Garrett, and Stephen Turner. "Making Sense of Christopher Dawson." in The History of Sociology in Britain (Palgrave Macmillan, Cham, 2019) pp. 103–136. online
 Quinn, Dermot. "Christopher Dawson: Historian and Prophet of Our Time," Humanitas, [n.d].
 Quinn, Dermot. "Dawson’s Creed," The American Conservative, 1 February 2010.
 Russello, Gerald J. "Christopher Dawson's 'America and the Secularization of Modern Culture.'" Logos, Vol. 3, 2000.
 Russello, Gerald J. "Christopher Dawson: Christ in History," Crisis Magazine, 27 December 2011.
 Schwartz, Adam. "Confronting the "Totalitarian Antichrist": Christopher Dawson and Totalitarianism," The Catholic Historical Review, Volume 89, Number 3, July 2003.
 Scott, Christina. A Historian and His World: A Life of Christopher Dawson, 1889-1970, Sheed & Ward, 1984.
 Staudt, R. Jared. "'Religion and culture' and 'faith and the renewal of society' in Christopher Dawson and Pope Benedict XVI." Logos: A Journal of Catholic Thought and Culture 16.1 (2013): 31-69. online
 Trepanier, Lee. "Culture and History in Eric Voegelin and Christopher Dawson." Political Science Reviewer 41.2 (2017). online
 Ward, Leo R. "Dawson on Education in Christian Culture," Modern Age, Fall 1973.

External links
 Catholic Education Resource Center: Christopher Dawson.
 The Christopher Dawson Society for Philosophy and Culture Inc.
 The Christopher Dawson Collection
 
 Rediscovering Christopher Dawson: An Interview with Dr. Bradley J. Birzer
 The Achievement of Christopher Dawson

1889 births
1970 deaths
20th-century English historians
Academics of the University of Edinburgh
Alumni of Trinity College, Oxford
Christian humanists
Converts to Roman Catholicism from Anglicanism
English Anglo-Catholics
English Roman Catholics
English Roman Catholic writers
Fellows of the British Academy
Harvard Divinity School faculty
People educated at Winchester College
People from Hay-on-Wye
Sociologists of religion
World historians